Vital Joachim Chamorin (16 August 1773 — 25 March 1811) was a French general officer who was known for commanding the 26th French Dragoons Regiment during the Peninsular War. He was killed at the Battle of Campo Maior while fighting against the British light cavalry of William Carr Beresford.

French generals
French military personnel of the French Revolutionary Wars
French commanders of the Napoleonic Wars
1773 births
1811 deaths
Names inscribed under the Arc de Triomphe
French military personnel killed in the Napoleonic Wars